Stenoptilodes littoralis is a moth of the family Pterophoridae that is only known from the Hawaiian islands of Kauai, Oahu, Molokai and Hawaii. Though it is only known from the Hawaiian Islands, it may be an introduced species.

It is a highly variable species. Adults have two-lobed forewings and three-lobed hindwings, and very long legs.

The larvae of subspecies S. l. littoralis have been recorded on Geranium cariolinianum australe, while subspecies S. l.  rhynchophora feeds on Vaccinium species, including Vaccinium penduliflorurn, Vaccinium reticulatum and Vaccinium calycinum. The larvae are green and long and skinny.

Subspecies
Stenoptilodes littoralis littoralis (Kauai, Oahu, Molokai, Hawaii)
Stenoptilodes littoralis rhynchophora (Meyrick, 1888) (Kauai, Oahu, Molokai, Maui, Hawaii)

External links

"Stenoptilodes littoralis (Lepidoptera: Pterophoridae)". Archived from the original September 16, 2006. Moths of the Alaka`i Swamp. Department of Biological Sciences, University of Bristol. Retrieved November 22, 2017.

limaicus
Moths described in 1882
Endemic fauna of Hawaii
Insects of North America